Wolley-Dod is a British surname. Notable people with the surname include:
 Anthony Hurt Wolley-Dod (1861–1948), British botanist
 Charles Wolley-Dod (1892–1937), British aviator, nephew of Anthony Hurt Wolley-Dod

Compound surnames